The Slovakia national rugby union team has yet to qualify for a Rugby World Cup. They are currently affiliated to FIRA-AER, but not yet to World Rugby.

History
Slovakia played their first match in 2006 against the Principality of Monaco and lost 0-6. However, the points went to them after it was discovered that Monaco had used ineligible players. 

In 2009, they withdrew from European competition for financial reasons, after having been unable to secure sponsorship. However, they returned to European competition in 2010, playing in the 2010–12 European Nations Cup Third Division.

The new dynamic has been supported by the city of Bratislava and the Government of Slovakia.

Record

Overall

See also
 Rugby union in Slovakia
 Czechoslovakia national rugby union team

References

External links
 Official site
 Slovakia on rugbydata.com
 Statistics on rugbyinternational.net

Teams in European Nations Cup (rugby union)
European national rugby union teams
Rugby union in Slovakia
Rugby union